The Flaming Ember was an American soul band from Detroit, Michigan, United States, who found commercial success starting in the late 1960s.

The group originally formed in Detroit in 1964. At that time they were known as The Flaming Embers, named for a local Detroit restaurant. In 1969, they signed with Hot Wax Records, (the label founded by Brian Holland, Lamont Dozier, and Edward Holland, Jr.), after the band had recorded for a number of smaller Detroit-area labels since 1965.  They recorded for Ed Wingate's Ric Tic label in 1967, but when Berry Gordy, Jr.'s Motown Records purchased Golden Records/Ric-Tic from Wingate, the Flaming Ember chose not to sign with Motown.

They dropped the "s" from its name and scored a pop and rhythm and blues hit with "Mind, Body and Soul" in 1969 (number 26 on the US Billboard pop singles chart); they hit charts again with their signature song (and heartland rock antecedent) "Westbound #9" (number 24 US pop, number 15 US Billboard R&B chart), and "I'm Not My Brother's Keeper" (number 34 pop, number 12 R&B). The three songs were all released between late 1969 and late 1970.

Follow-up efforts such as 1971's "Stop the World and Let Me Off" were not as successful. After changing their name to Mind, Body and Soul they spent the rest of the 1970s playing the Detroit bar circuit.

The band was inducted into the Rockabilly Hall of Fame in 1999.

The Flaming Embers reunited in 2004, played at the Rockabilly Festival in Tennessee and completed a CD.

Members
 Joe Sladich, guitar (replaced by Mark McCoy in 1972, and in recent reunion), died from throat cancer
 Bill Ellis, keyboards
 John Goins, keyboard, backup vocals from late 1960s to mid 1970s, died December 26, 2018 from kidney failure
 Jim Bugnel, bass guitar (replaced Mike Jackson in 1966)
 Jerry Plunk, drums and lead vocals
 Dennis Mills, bass guitar (early to mid 1970s), played in the group Mind, Body and Soul (not Flaming Ember)
 Larry Gregg, drums, died on 20 April 2010

References

External links
Flaming Ember | Biography, Albums, Streaming Links
A brief history
Interview with Plunk and Bugnel

American pop music groups
American soul musical groups
Musical groups from Detroit
Ric-Tic Records artists
1964 establishments in Michigan